Grzegorz Fijałek (born 11 May 1987 in Andrychów) is a Polish male beach volleyball player. He competed in the 2012 Summer Olympics with his partner Mariusz Prudel.  The other teams in their pool, group D, were Aleksandrs Samoilovs and Ruslans Sorokins (Latvia), Jake Gibb and Sean Rosenthal (USA) and the South African team of Freedom Chiya and Grant Goldschmidt.  They lost to the Latvian team, but beat the South African and American teams.  Next they played the Swiss pair of Sascha Heyer and Seba Chevallier in the last 16, winning two sets to nil.  In the quarterfinals they lost to the Brazilian team of Emanuel Rego and Alison Cerutti.

Prudel and Fijałek were considered to be medal contenders in the 2012 Olympics.

References

External links
 
 
 
 
 

1987 births
Living people
Polish beach volleyball players
Men's beach volleyball players
Beach volleyball players at the 2012 Summer Olympics
Beach volleyball players at the 2016 Summer Olympics
Olympic beach volleyball players of Poland
People from Andrychów
Sportspeople from Lesser Poland Voivodeship
Beach volleyball players at the 2020 Summer Olympics